ASCB may refer to:

 Accreditation Service For Certifying Bodies (Europe)
 Address Space Control Block
 Advertising Standards Complaints Board
 American Society for Cell Biology
 Andres Soriano Colleges of Bislig
 Army Sports Control Board
 Associação dos Servidores Civis do Brasil (Association of Civil Servants in Brazil)